The House of Khevenhüller is the name of an old and important Carinthian noble family, documented there since 1356, with its ancestral seat at Landskron Castle. In the 16th century, the family split into the two branches of Khevenhüller-Frankenburg, Imperial Counts (i.e. immediate counts of the Holy Roman Empire) from 1593, and Khevenhüller-Hochosterwitz, raised to Imperial Counts in 1725 and, as Khevenhüller-Metsch, to princely rank (Fürsten) in 1763. The family belongs to high nobility.

In the present-day Austrian state of Carinthia, the princely family of Khevenhüller-Metsch owns the Renaissance castle of Hochosterwitz, a significant edifice and major tourist attraction.

History 
The noble family originally possibly originated in Kevenhüll (today part of Beilngries) in Franconia; they were vassals of the Bishops of Bamberg, who had received large estates in Carinthia from the hands of King Henry II of Germany in 1007. The earliest mention refers to one Ulreich dem Chevenhuelaer in a 1330 deed. In Carinthia, a continuous line descends from one Johann I (Hans) Khevenhüller, who died in 1356 and was the son-in-law of Richard I von Khünburg and Elisabeth von Himmelberg, both from Carinthia.

Johann IV von Khevenhüller zu Aichelberg (born ca 1420-1462) was the first to hold the family lordship of Aichelberg. His son, Johann V Khevenhüller (died 1462), son of Wilhelm II Khevenhüller and Margareta von Auersperg, was Burgrave of Federaun, and his son, Augustin Khevenhüller, who died 1516, was the Lord of Hardegg. His mother was one "Miss" von Lindegg, who together with her grandson Sigismund III, Herr Khevenhüller in Hohen-Osterwitz (1507–1558) appears among the ancestors of King Charles III. Her youngest grandson, Bernard von Khevenhüller (1511–1548) was the Lord of Sternberg and Hohenwart; her eldest grandson, Christoph Khevenhüller (1503–1557) was Lord of Aichelberg.

Christoph Khevenhüller 
The steep rise of the House of Khevenhüller in Carinthia began when in 1525 Christoph Khevenhüller (1503–57)  was appointed castellan of Ortenburg Castle near Spittal an der Drau and married a wealthy burgher's daughter, Elizabeth Mansdorfer.

Her wealth enabled him to acquire a number of properties in Carinthia such as the castles of Aichelberg, Ortenburg, Sommeregg,  Hochosterwitz and  Landskron as well as the iron mine of Eisentratten near Gmünd. Like the majority of the Carinthian Estates, Christoph Khevenhüller became a Lutheran Protestant. Of Christoph Khevenhüller's three sons, Hans, Moritz and Bartlmäus, two were politically and economically most successful, thus furthering the rise of the family:

Hans Khevenhüller 
Hans Khevenhüller (1538–1606) became the Legate of the Holy Roman Emperor at the Spanish court, an office that he held for 26 years. Educated at the University of Padua, he knew Latin and Italian. He was appointed Imperial Chamberlain, was made a Knight of the Order of the Golden Fleece in 1587 and a count in 1593, a rank  that upon his death passed on to his brother Bartlmäus. During his lifetime, he sought and collected animals and plants of economic importance from many parts of the world.

Bartlmäus Khevenhüller 
The activities of Bartlmäus Khevenhüller (1539–1613) centred on Carinthia. Styling himself "Freiherr auf Landskron and Wernberg" he made it to Burggrave und Speaker of the  Estates, and managed to make the Khevenhüller family one of the wealthiest in the German Reich. He also figured as the head of the Protestants in Carinthia.

When in the course of the counter-reformation Emperor Ferdinand II abolished the nobility's religious freedom in the Habsburg lands,  the Protestant members of the Khevenhüller family were forced to abandon their possessions in Carinthia and emigrated to Germany in 1628. Among these was also the great-grandmother of   Nicolaus Ludwig Reichsgraf von Zinzendorf und Pottendorf of the Moravian Church or Herrnhuter Brüdergemeine. Interrelation with the noble Saxonian Metzsch family began that led to the Khevenhüller-Metsch branch, which later also spread to Spain where as marquesses and dukes they became Grandees of Spain.

Paul Khevenhüller 
A Protestant, Paul Khevenhüller (1593–1655)  sided with the Swedish king during the Thirty Years' War lending Gustav Adolf 70,000 Swedish riksdalers to finance the war. After the king's death the Swedish state was incapable of repaying the loan and compensated the lender with the property of Julita Gård in Södermanland, which remained the residence of his descendants late into the 19th century.

Notable members of the House of Khevenhüller 
 Ulrich Khevenhüller (b. ca. 1430–1492), youngest son of Hans II Khevenhüller, knight
 George Khevenhüller (1533–1587), "State Captain", i.e. governor of the Duchy of Carinthia.
 Hans Graf Khevenhüller-Frankenburg (1538–1606), Imperial ambassador to the Spanish Court.
 Franz Christoph Graf von Khevenhüller-Frankenburg (1588–1650), Imperial ambassador to the Spanish Court
 Paul Khevenhüller (1593–1655), financier of the Swedish king in the Thirty Years' War
 Sigmund Friedrich von Khevenhüller (1666–1742), governor of the Duchy of Carinthia, vicegerent of the Duchy of Lower Austria.

 Ludwig Andreas Khevenhüller Graf von Aichelberg-Frankenburg  (1683–1744), Austrian field marshal
 Johann Joseph Fürst Khevenhüller-Metsch (1706–1776), Lord Great Chamberlain ("Oberstkämmerer") of  Maria Theresa
 Johann Carl Khevenhüller (1839–1905), member of Maximilian I of Mexico's corps of volunteers

Princes of Khevenhüller-Metsch 
 Johann Joseph Khevenhüller-Metsch (1706–1776), son of the former, 1763 Prince von Khevenhüller-Metsch; married to Karolina Maria Augustina Countess von Metsch, daughter of Count Johann Adolf
 Johann Sigismund Friedrich (1732–1801), son of the former, 2nd  Prince von Khevenhüller-Metsch; ∞ I Maria Amalia Susanna, Princess of Liechtenstein, daughter of  Prince Emanuel; married to II Marie Josephine Henriette Barbara Countess of  Strassoldo, daughter of  Vinzenz
 Karl Maria Joseph Johann Baptist Clemens (1756–1823), son of the former, 3rd Prince von Khevenhüller-Metsch; married to Therese Countess  Morzin, daughter of Karl Joseph
 Franz Maria Johann Joseph Hermann (1762–1837), brother of the former, 4th Prince von Khevenhüller-Metsch; married to  I Maria Elisabeth Countess of  Kuefstein, daughter of Johann Adam; married to II Maria Josepha Countess of  Abensberg and Traun, daughter of  Otto; married to  III Christina Countess Zichy of Zich and Vasonykeö, daughter of Karl
 Richard Maria Johann Basil (1813–1877), son of the former, 5th Prince zu Khevenhüller-Metsch; married to Antonia Maria Countess Lichnowsky, daughter of Prince Eduard
 Johannes Franz Karl Eduard Joseph Nemesius (1839–1905), son of the former, 6th Prince zu Khevenhüller-Metsch; married to Eduardine Countess von Clam-Gallas, daughter of Eduard
 Anton Sigismund Joseph Maria (1873–1945), nephew of the former, until 1919 (abolition of aristocratic titles) the 7th Prince zu Khevenhüller-Metsch; married to Gabriele Countess von Mensdorff-Pouilly
 Franz Khevenhüller-Metsch (1889–1977); married to Anna Princess zu Fürstenberg (1894–1928), daughter of Maximilian Egon Prince zu Fürstenberg
 Maximilian Khevenhüller-Metsch (1919–2010) married to Wilhelmine Gräfin Henckel von Donnersmarck (born 1932), daughter of Lazarus Graf Henckel von Donnersmarck (1902–1991) and  Franziska Gräfin von und zu Eltz (1905–1997)
 Johannes Khevenhüller-Metsch (1956–2020); married to Donna Camilla Borghese dei Principi di Nettuno (born 1962), daughter of Don Giovanni-Angelo Borghese dei Principi di Nettuno and Donna Lydia dei Conti Cremisini

Current head of the Khevenhüller-Metsch family 
 Johannes Khevenhüller-Metsch (born as Maria Johannes Franz Xaver Lazarus Maximilian Felix Hubertus 10e Fürst von Khevenhüller-Metsch; 1956); married to Donna Camilla Borghese dei Principi di Nettuno (born 1962)

  Maximilian, 9th Prince 1977-2010 (1919-2010)
 Johannes, 10th Prince 2010-2020 (1956-2020)
 Bartholomäus, 11th Prince 2020–present (b.1958)
 Prince Ludwig (b.1988)
  Prince Philipp (b.1998)
 Prince Karl (b.1959)
 Prince Maximilian (b.1993)
 Prince Franz (b.1995) 
  Prince Sigismund (b.1997)
  Prince Georg (b.1960)

Spanish branch 
Don Camillo Ruspoli y Khevenhüller-Metsch, Duke of Sueca (1788–1864), married Carlota de Godoy, 2nd Duchess of Sueca
Don Adolfo Ruspoli, 2nd Duke of Alcudia (1822–1914), Grandee of Spain First Class
Don Luigi Ruspoli, 3rd Marquis of Boadilla del Monte (1828–1893)

Notes

References 
 Bernhard Czerwenka, Die Khevenhüller, Vienna:  Braumüller, 1867.
 Karl Dinklage, Kärnten um 1620. Die Bilder der Khevenhüllerchronik, Vienna: Edition Tusch, 1980.
 Franz Müllner,Johann Carl Fürst Khevenhüller-Metsch, ein Kampfgefährte Kaiser Maximilians von Mexiko. In Maximilian von Mexiko 1832-1867, Vienna: Enzenhofer, 1974.
 Peter Thaler, Von Kärnten nach Schweden: Die evangelischen Glaubensflüchtlinge der Familien Khevenhüller und Paul. Klagenfurt: Verlag des Kärntner Landesarchivs, 2010. ISBN 9783900531751.

External links 

Burg Hochosterwitz
Website of Hochosterwitz Castle (owned by the princely family of Khevenhüller-Metsch)
Collegium es nobilis Austriae: Khevenhüller-Metsch

Early Khevenhüllers

Austrian noble families
Lists of princes
German families
Carinthia (state)
People from Carinthia (state)
Spanish noble families